St. Ann is a city in northwest St. Louis County, Missouri, United States. The population was 13,019 at the 2020 census.

History
The city was established in 1948 but began to develop six years before it was granted the petition of incorporation. Charles F. Vatterott, the developer and builder of most of the residential and commercial properties in St. Ann, started the community as a housing project for families of workers employed in nearby defense plants. It was one of the few defense housing projects in the country to develop into a permanent town.  The original homesite was dedicated in honor of Saint Ann, the mother of the Virgin Mary.

Geography
St. Ann is located at  (38.727184, -90.385515) in the north-central part of the St. Louis area. St. Ann also borders Lambert-St. Louis International Airport. Municipal neighbors to St. Ann are Bridgeton, Edmundson, Woodson Terrace, Breckenridge Hills, Overland, and a large portion of unincorporated St. Louis County that lies between Maryland Heights and Creve Coeur.

Demographics

2020 census
In 2020, there were 13,019 people living in the city. The racial makeup of the city was 54.8% White (54.0% non-Hispanic), 29.4% African American, 0.7% Native American, 2.8% Asian, 4.3% from other races, and 7.9% from two or more races. Hispanic or Latino of any race were 6.9% of the population.

2010 census
At the 2010 census there were 13,020 people, 5,894 households, and 3,259 families living in the city. The racial makeup of the city was 69.5% White, 22.1% African American, 0.3% Native American, 2.2% Asian, 3.0% from other races, and 2.8% from two or more races. Hispanic or Latino of any race were 5.7%.

Of the 5,894 households 28.3% had children under the age of 18 living with them, 31.6% were married couples living together, 17.9% had a female householder with no husband present, 5.8% had a male householder with no wife present, and 44.7% were non-families. 38.4% of households were one person and 12% were one person aged 65 or older. The average household size was 2.21 and the average family size was 2.93.

The median age was 37.1 years. 22.4% of residents were under the age of 18; 9.2% were between the ages of 18 and 24; 28% were from 25 to 44; 27.4% were from 45 to 64; and 13% were 65 or older. The gender makeup of the city was 47.5% male and 52.5% female.

2000 census
At the 2000 census there were 13,607 people, 6,190 households, and 3,447 families living in the city. The racial makeup of the city was 82.71% White, 11.44% African American, 0.28% Native American, 1.99% Asian, 0.01% Pacific Islander, 1.79% from other races, and 1.78% from two or more races. Hispanic or Latino of any race were 4.12%.

Of the 6,190 households 25.8% had children under the age of 18 living with them, 37.4% were married couples living together, 14.3% had a female householder with no husband present, and 44.3% were non-families. 37.3% of households were one person and 13.2% were one person aged 65 or older. The average household size was 2.19 and the average family size was 2.90.

The age distribution was 22.3% under the age of 18, 9.5% from 18 to 24, 31.8% from 25 to 44, 20.2% from 45 to 64, and 16.2% 65 or older. The median age was 37 years. For every 100 females, there were 93.5 males. For every 100 females age 18 and over, there were 87.8 males.

The median household income was $32,351 and the median family income  was $41,135. Males had a median income of $31,091 versus $24,064 for females. The per capita income for the city was $18,318. About 10.4% of families and 12.8% of the population were below the poverty line, including 19.0% of those under age 18 and 6.8% of those age 65 or over.

Education
The city is served by two school districts, Pattonville School District and Ritenour School District.

St. Louis County Library operates the Rock Road Branch in St. Ann.

Business 
Northwest Plaza, the largest enclosed shopping mall in Missouri, was located in St. Ann. However, the mall was closed in October 2010. At its peak, the mall contained 9 anchor stores and 210 smaller stores. Northwest Plaza was mostly demolished in 2013 to make way for the Crossings at Northwest a mixed-use retail and office project. Menard's Home Improvement Stores opened a 150,000SF store in August 2015, their 4th store in the St. Louis Metro Area at the Crossings.  
Charter Communications leased 135,000SF of an old Macy's Department Store and renovated it into a call/technology center that wemploys over a 1,000 employees. Save-a-Lot Corporation maintains its corporate headquarters at the Crossings at Northwest.

City Services

Parks & Recreation - The City maintains a 50,000 SF Community Center, 34-par, 9-hole golf course on  The city's six parks are Tiemeyer, Livingston & Wright, Buder, St. Ann, Schafer and Mary Ridge.   The City is currently building a multi-million outdoor state-of-the-art outdoor Aquatic Center in Tiemeyer Park to replace a pool that was bult in 1988. 

Public Services - The City's Public Services Department consists of the Building & Zoning Divisions and Street Maintenance. The Street Maintenance Division oversees 42 miles of City maintained streets and administers an annual street maintenance capital improvement program with an annual budget of over $1,000,000. 

Police - The City maintains its own municipal police department consisting of 47 sworn officers and 17 civilian employees.  The Department is certified as a through the Commission on Accreditation for Law Enforcement Agencies (CALEA)  The Department provides 911 Dispatching Services through the North Central Dispatch Cooperative to multiple neighboring police agencies under contract.  North Central Dispatch is also certified through CALEA's Public Safety Communications Accreditation Program and is one of only two municipal police dispatch centers in the entire State of Missouri to be Certified through CALEA. The Department has a close working relationship with the two public school districts (Ritenour and Pattonville) that serve St. Ann and places School Resource Officers in all public schools in St. Ann as well as Ritenour High School.

References

External links

 

Cities in St. Louis County, Missouri
Cities in Missouri